Events from the year 1986 in South Korea.

Incumbents 
 President: Chun Doo-hwan
 Prime Minister: Lho Shin-yong

Events

Births 

 January 15 – Han Hye-lyoung, field hockey player
 January 26 – Park Mi-hyun, field hockey player
 February 5 – Kim Min-woo, figure skater
 February 18 – Kim Jong-eun, field hockey player
 February 28 – Choi Eun-sook fencer
 March 4 – Park Min-young, actress
 March 22 – Jeon Boram, singer and actress
 May 12 – Im Dong-hyun, archer
 May 29 – No Min-woo, actor and musician
 May 31 – Jang Hee-sun, field hockey player
 June 1 – Lee Jang-woo, actor and singer
 June 4 – Yoochun, singer-songwriter and actor
 August 16 – Kim Oh-sung, footballer
 September 23 – Shin A-lam, fencer
 September 26 – Yoon Shi-yoon, actor and television personality
 September 30 – Ki Hong Lee, actor
 October 6 – Yoo Ah-in, actor
 November 5 – BoA, singer, songwriter, record producer and actress
 November 19 – Kwak Jung-hye, sport shooter

See also 
 List of South Korean films of 1986
 Years in Japan
 Years in North Korea

References 

 
South Korea
Years of the 20th century in South Korea
1980s in South Korea
South Korea